Icarus is the first studio album by the band The Forms, produced by Steve Albini and released on February 25, 2003.

Track listing
 "Stel" - 0:57
 "Stel (Continued)" - 1:24
 "Innizar" - 0:15
 "Innizar (Continued)" - 3:28
 "Sunday" - 2:22
 "Sunday (Continued)" - 0:30
 "Seagull" - 1:36
 "Classical" - 3:43
 "Stravinsky" - 1:52
 "Black Metal" - 1:41

Reception
Upon release, Icarus gained generally positive reviews, and critics compared the band favorably to early-emo rock group Sunny Day Real Estate. Mac Randall of The New York Observer described the band as "aggro-artsy trio fond of awkward time signatures, sly rhythmic manipulation, curlicuing vocal lines, and giving one song two separate track numbers for no obvious reason... [T]hese guys make a virtue out of attention-deficit disorder."  PopMatters called the band "one of the most exciting, if not one of the best, new acts in indie rock right now."

References

2003 debut albums
albums produced by Steve Albini